Nia Zulkarnaen (born 19 June 1970) is an Indonesian singer, actress and producer. She is the daughter of the director Dicky Zulkarnaen and veteran indonesian actress Mieke Wijaya.

Filmography

Films 
 Jeritan Si Buyung (Screams The Boys; 1977)
 Darna Ajaib (Magic Darna; 1980)
 Merpati Tak Pernah Ingkar Janji (Doves never break a promise; 1986)
 Cemburu Nih.. Yee... (Jealous Yes.. Yee...; 1986)
 Sama Juga Bohong (The Same Lie; 1986)
 Aku Benci Kamu (I Hate You; 1987)
 Jodoh Boleh Diatur (Cars May be Regulated; 1988)
 Bukan Main (Absurdly)
 Kristal Kristal Cinta (Crystals of the Love; 1989)
 Isabella (1990)
 Lagu Untuk Seruni (Songs For Seruni; 1991)
 Pintar-Pintaran (Ingenious-Clever; 1992)
 Denias, Senandung Di Atas Awan (Denias, Humming Above The Clouds; 2006)

Soap operas 
 Bunga-Bunga Kehidupan 
 Antara Jakarta-Perth  
 Cinta Rasa Tora Bika 
 Doa Dan Cinta 
 Bayangan Adinda  
 Romansa 21 
 Pura-Pura Buta

Producer
 Denias, Senandung Di Atas Awan (Denias, Humming Above The Clouds; 2006)
 Liburan Seruuu...!! (Holiday Fuuuns; 2008)
 Serdadu Kembang (Beetles Soldiers; 2011)
 Di Timur Matahari (In The East of Sun; 2012)

TV commercials
 GIV
 Lux
 Emeron
 Nivea 
 Tora Bika
 So Klin 
 Mama Lemon
 Ekonomi

Discography
 Aku Tetap Menunggu (1985)
 Benang-benang Cinta (1985)
 Senandung Malam  (1985)
 Kesepian (1986)
 Kepastian (1987)
 Satukan Hatiku (1988)
 Jangan Pisahkan Aku (1992)
 Kuingin Bersamamu (1993)
 Kanda Disini (1994)
 Hanya Padamu (1997)

References

External links

  Profil Nia Zulkarnaen Kapanlagi.com

1970 births
Living people
Indonesian film producers
Indonesian female models
20th-century Indonesian women singers
Indonesian rock singers
Indonesian pop singers
Citra Award winners
Indonesian child actresses
Indonesian television actresses
Indonesian film actresses
Actresses from Jakarta
Indo people
Indonesian people of Australian descent
Indonesian people of Dutch descent
Betawi people
Sundanese people
Indonesian Muslims
21st-century Indonesian actresses
20th-century Indonesian actresses